is a Japanese science fiction manga series written and illustrated by Moto Hagio. It was serialized in three issues of Shogakukan's Bessatsu Shōjo Comic magazine in 1975. The following year, it won the 21st Shogakukan Manga Award in the combined  and  category. The series has inspired a live-action television film, an anime film, multiple stage plays, and an audio drama CD. It also inspired a sequel manga series, serialized in Bessatsu Shōjo Comic magazine from 1976 to 1977. They Were Eleven was originally licensed in English by Viz Media and published in the manga anthology Four Shōjo Stories in 1996. The series and its sequel have been licensed by Denpa for a new English-language release in 2022. The anime film was originally licensed in English by Central Park Media, but it was discontinued in 2004.

Story
Ten young space cadets are put onto a decommissioned spaceship as their final test. If they pass this test, their lifelong dreams of being valued people in their respective societies will come true. Their orders are to survive as long as they can with what they have. Once they arrive at the ship, they find that their crew has gained an eleventh member—and no one can remember the original lineup well enough to recognize which of them is the newcomer.

As the days pass, the eleven cadets must deal with their suspicions of each other as well as the sudden knowledge that the spaceship is in a decaying orbit around a star, which is causing the temperature on the ship to rise. With this rise in temperature, a sickness begins to spread among the crew as they work to stabilize their orbit and determine who among them is the spy.

Media

Manga
They Were Eleven was serialized in the September, October, and November issues of Shogakukan's Bessatsu Shōjo Comic magazine in 1975. Shogakukan collected the individual chapters, along with three unrelated short stories by Hagio, into a single  volume published on July 20, 1976. Shogakukan has since reissued They Were Eleven several times: in 1978, 1986, 1994, 2007, and 2019. Viz Media originally licensed the series for an English-language release in North America, published in the now out-of-print anthology Four Shōjo Stories in 1996. In 2021, Denpa re-licensed the series for publication in the third quarter of 2022. They Were Eleven is also licensed by Ediciones Tomodomo in Spain and by Japonica Polonica Fantastica in Poland.

Sequel
A sequel manga series, titled , was serialized in the December, January, and February issues of Bessatsu Shōjo Comic magazine in 1976 and 1977. Shogakukan collected the individual chapters into a single  volume published on August 20, 1977. Shogakukan has since reissued  several times: first in 1978, and later in collected editions of They Were Eleven published in 1986, 1994, 2007, and 2019. In 2021, Denpa licensed the sequel series for an English-language release in North America and was published in the third quarter of 2022.

Live-action film
A 45-minute live-action television film adaptation of the manga was broadcast in Japan on January 2, 1977, as part of the NHK's Shōnen Drama Series. The film's screenplay was written by Mamoru Sasaki. It starred Taizō Sayama as Tada and the Takarazuka Revue's Haruka Yamashiro as Frol.

Anime film
A 91-minute anime film adaptation of the manga was released in Japan on November 1, 1986. It was licensed by Central Park Media in North America and released on VHS with English subtitles in the early 1990s. It was re-released on VHS with a newly produced English dub in 1996 and on DVD with dual language audio tracks in 2004. Central Park Media discontinued their home video release in 2004. The New York company MYC & Associates liquidated the anime license in 2009.

Cast
 Tadatos Lane (Tada): Akira Kamiya (Japanese), Curtis Jones (English)
 Frolbericheri Frol (Frol): Michiko Kawai (Japanese), Wendee Lee (English)
 King Mayan Baceska (His Majesty): Hideyuki Tanaka (Japanese), Steven Blum (English)
 Doricas Soldam IV (Fourth): Toshio Furukawa (Japanese), David Hayter (English)
 Ganigus Gagtos (Ganga): Tesshō Genda (Japanese), Dean Elliot (English)
 Amazon Carnias (Amazon): Hirotaka Suzuoki (Japanese), Steven Blum (English)
 Vidminer Knume (Knu): Norio Wakamoto (Japanese), Joe Romersa (English)
 Colonel Glenn Groff (Mule): Michihiro Ikemizu (Japanese), Henry Malloy (English)
 Dolph Tasta (Red nose): Kōzō Shioya (Japanese), Steven Blum (English)
 Toto Ni (Toto): Tarako (Japanese), Dorothy Elias-Fahn (English)
 Chaco Kacka (Chaco): Tsutomu Kashiwakura (Japanese), Dean Allen (English)

Staff
 Director: Satoshi Dezaki, 
 Executive Producer: 
 Original Story: Moto Hagio
 Planning: 
 Screenplay: Toshiaki Imaizumi, Katsumi Koide
 Animation Director: Keizo Shimizu
 Character Design: Akio Sugino, Keizo Shimizu
 Effects Director: Kenichi Maejima
 Mechanical Design: Yōichi Yajima
 Art Director: 
 Cinematography: Nobuo Koyama
 Audio Director: Shigeharu Shiba
 Music Director: Zen Oikawa
 Music: Yasuhiko Fukuda
 Theme Song: "Boku no Honesty", 
 Producer: Minoru Kotoku
 Production: Magic Bus, Kitty Films

Stage plays
They Were Eleven has been adapted into several stage plays in Japan. The first, performed by the all-male acting troupe , ran from June to July 2004; the second, performed by Axel, ran from December 2008 to January 2009; the third, performed by the all-male acting troupe , ran from February to March 2011; the fourth, performed by Studio Life, ran throughout January 2013; and the fifth, performed by Studio Life, ran from May to June 2019.

The sequel manga series has also been adapted into two stage plays in Japan: one performed by Studio Life, which ran from February to April 2013, and another performed by the female idol group Morning Musume '16, which ran throughout June 2016.

Audio drama
An audio drama adaptation of the manga was produced by the drama CD label E-Star and released in Japan on September 25, 2013. It starred Atsushi Abe as Tada, Kazutomi Yamamoto as Frol, Kōsuke Toriumi as King Mayan Baceska, and Daisuke Kishio as Doricas Soldam IV.

Reception
In 1976, They Were Eleven won the 21st (1975) Shogakukan Manga Award in the combined  and  category.

See also
 Lily C.A.T.

References

External links
 
 
 

1975 manga
1986 anime films
Central Park Media
Japanese drama television series
Magic Bus (studio)
Moto Hagio
NHK original programming
Science fiction anime and manga
Shogakukan franchises
Shogakukan manga
Shōjo manga
Suspense anime and manga
Viz Media manga
Winners of the Shogakukan Manga Award for shōjo manga
Winners of the Shogakukan Manga Award for shōnen manga